Cascina Antonietta is a station on Line 2 of the Milan Metro in the village of Cascina Antonietta, a suburb of Gorgonzola. It is the station with the lowest number of passengers in the system, with an average of 600 passengers per day in 2018.

History
The station was opened 13 April 1985, as part of the extension from Gorgonzola to Gessate.

Station structure 
It is a surface station with two platforms and two tracks.

Note 

Line 2 (Milan Metro) stations
Railway stations opened in 1981
1981 establishments in Italy
Railway stations in Italy opened in the 20th century